Gonzalo Ramiro de Jesús María del Castillo Crespo (20 September 1936 – 14 January 2019) was a Bolivian Roman Catholic bishop.

Early life 
Del Castillo Crespo was born in Bolivia and was ordained to the priesthood in 1964. He served as titular bishop of Themisonium and as auxiliary bishop of the Roman Catholic Archdiocese of La Paz, Bolivia, from 1983 to 2000 and as bishop of the Military Ordinariate of Bolivia from 2000 to 2012.

Notes

1936 births
2019 deaths
20th-century Roman Catholic bishops in Bolivia
21st-century Roman Catholic bishops in Bolivia
Bolivian Roman Catholic bishops
Roman Catholic bishops of La Paz
Roman Catholic military bishops of Bolivia